The FIL European Luge Natural Track Championships 1997 took place in Moos in Passeier, Italy.

Men's singles

Women's singles

Panyutina followed up her silver medal at the previous championships with a gold medal this time.

Men's doubles

Medal table

References
Men's doubles natural track European champions
Men's singles natural track European champions
Women's singles natural track European champions

FIL European Luge Natural Track Championships
1997 in luge
Luge in Italy
1997 in Italian sport
International sports competitions hosted by Italy